Pascal Fries (born January 28, 1972) is a German neurophysiologist.

Vita 
Pascal Fries was born in St. Ingbert. He studied medicine from 1991 to 1993 at the University of Saarland and from 1993 at the Johann Wolfgang Goethe University Frankfurt am Main, where he completed his medical studies in 1998 with the state examination. For his doctoral thesis, he worked from 1993 to 1998 in the department of Prof. Wolf Singer at the Max Planck Institute for Brain Research in Frankfurt and received his PhD in 2000 from the Johann Wolfgang Goethe University. From 1999 to 2001 he was a postdoctoral fellow in the laboratory of Dr. Robert Desimone in the National Institute of Mental Health in Bethesda in the USA. From 2001 to 2009 he was Principal Investigator at the Donders Centre for Cognitive Neuroimaging of the Radboud University Nijmegen in the Netherlands, where he also holds a professorship since 2008. In the same year he became a scientific member of the Max Planck Society and began in 2009 the work as founding director of the Ernst Strüngmann Institute (ESI) for Neuroscience in collaboration with the Max Planck Society in Frankfurt.

Honors and awards
1991–1998: Scholarship from the German National Academic Foundation
1999–2001: Postdoctoral membership at the German National Academic Foundation (BASF)
2000: Graduate (Summa cum laude) at the Goethe-University Frankfurt, medical specialty
2001: Award for the best dissertation of 2000, Johann Wolfgang Goethe-Universität Frankfurt am Main, medical specialty
2003: „VIDI“ Award for career development from the'Netherlands Organization for Scientific Research (NWO)
2006: EURYI (European Young Investigator) Award from the European Science Foundation
2006: Membership in The Young Academy of The Royal Netherlands Academy of Arts and Sciences
2007: Bernhard Katz prize
2008: Boehringer Ingelheim FENS (Federation of European Neuroscience Societies) Research Award

External links 
Prof. Dr. med. Pascal Fries (Vita) from the Max-Planck-Gesellschaft, München (German)
Personal 2009 (Supplement to the Annual Report of the Max Planck Society), p. 6: First Director at Ernst Strüngmann Institute.
German brain researchers win European young investigator prize. biotechnologie.de, 17. August 2006
"Ernst Strüngmann Institute website: Fries Lab"

1972 births
German physiologists
Living people
Neurophysiologists